Extreme Dodgeball is an American game show based on the game of dodgeball that aired between 2004 and 2005 on the Game Show Network. The series ran for three seasons, each of which featured six to eight teams of five to seven players. The first series followed gimmick teams, such as sumo wrestlers and jockeys, which changed over time into the third series with franchise-like teams representing cities. All three series are presented by Bil Dwyer and Zach Selwyn.

The series was created by Rich Cronin and produced by Mindless Entertainment and made to accompany the Rawson Marshall Thurber movie Dodgeball: A True Underdog Story.

Standard rules

The game is a variation of dodgeball, in which players from each team attempt to hit players from the other team with a ball in order to eliminate them from the round without leaving their half of the court.

In the first two seasons, two teams of five compete in a match of three rounds in a best-of-three format. This was altered significantly for season three, see "Other Rule Changes and Amendments" below. A round ends when one of the two teams loses all five of its members. The first round is standard and is played with two dodgeballs. In the second round, often called the "Big Ball Round," a third ball which is twice the diameter of the other two is added into play. This ball is often used to deflect attacks. In the third round, "Dead Man Walking," the Big Ball is removed and in its place is an orange headband that is placed on one member of each team who is designated the "Dead Man Walking." In the first and second seasons, if the Dead Man Walking is eliminated, the team he represents loses the game and consequently the match.

Elimination
In each of the three seasons, there were multiple ways for an athlete to be eliminated and sent to the sideline. Some variations in these regulations exist in the three seasons, but for the most part these rules remain the same. The following are ways in which a member of a team can be eliminated:
 Getting hit with a ball
 Throwing a ball which an opponent catches (in this case, a person previously eliminated can come back in, but the number of people in the playing arena cannot exceed 5)
 Dropping a ball being used to deflect a ball thrown by an opposing player
 Crossing over the center line or (in seasons one and two) stepping outside the boundary
There are also two ways of returning to the game after being eliminated. The first, as previously mentioned, is if a player catches a ball. At this point, one of their teammates can come back onto the court, until five members are on the court. The second way is called a regeneration. In the first season, if all but one member of the team were eliminated, the last player had the opportunity to hit a target aptly named the "regeneration target" and, if this was accomplished before he was eliminated, all of his teammates returned to the court. In season two, the last player on the court only had to stay alive for 20 seconds, which would regenerate the entire team. In both cases, a team could only regenerate once per round. Lastly, in the third season, this rule was changed again. If the last player standing is able to not be eliminated for 30 seconds, only one of his teammates can return, but if the last player is eliminated, four team members return to the game. However, this could be done an unlimited number of times.

Other rule changes and amendments
For the second season, there were two more main changes. Firstly, there was a 5-second delay of game warning. If a team held more than one ball for over 5 seconds, one of its players would be out.

The second rule stated that if a player, in the opinion of the referee, was impeding the flow of play of the game by stalling, refusing to throw the ball, or attempting to force a play on the opposing team, the referee(s) could give that player a "yellow card". Two yellow cards meant that the player in question was ejected. This second rule was introduced in the early stages of the second season and is called the "Benedetto Amendment" after player David Benedetto, when he deliberately placed two balls immediately on his opponents' side of the court, forcing the opponents - in compliance with the above-stated five-second-rule - to approach the balls, allowing Benedetto to hit them at point blank range, a tactic which was deemed unfair by the show's producers. Although Michael 'Handsome' Constanza originally used the tactics in Episode 1 of Season 1, there was no five-second rule back then, so it was not as abusive.

In the third season, many significant changes were made to the rules. First, the teams would add two players each, increasing the number of players from five to seven. Still however, only five members of the team would be allowed on the court at any given time. The players who came on the court rotated, if four of a team's five players were eliminated, and the final player regenerated a teammate, the sixth member came onto the court.

The main change in this season was the format of the matches. Instead of 3 rounds which ended when all of the players on one of the teams were eliminated, the matches would be divided to four six-minute quarters. The victor would not be decided by the fastest elimination of an entire team, rather, the team with the most points at the end of the 24 minutes. If a player eliminates any opponent in any way, his team gains one point. A bonus point is awarded for wiping out the entire other team.

Other small changes were added. For example, if a player received a yellow card for yelling at the referee, holding a ball for too long, disobeying the instructions given, etc., he would have to stand in a small square while a player on the other team would be given a free shot at him. If the penalized player is hit, the opposing team scores a point, if the player leaves the square's boundaries, two points are awarded. Another small change was in the court itself. In previous seasons, the boundaries had been on the left, right, and front for each team. In this season, however, the left and right boundaries were removed and the court became similar to that of many indoor sports, such as indoor soccer or ice hockey.

In the second quarter, the Big Ball is put in play similar to the first two seasons. Since the big ball is used mainly for defending and is difficult to throw, two bonus points would be awarded for a kill through throwing.

In the third and fourth quarters, the teams are on the side opposite of that which they started. In the fourth quarter, the orange Dead Man Walking headband comes into play. One person on each team must wear the headband at all times. Any time a Dead Man Walking is eliminated, the other team gains two bonus points, but does not win the game. The headband is simply transferred to someone else. When two minutes remain in this quarter, there is a break in the game where the teams are allowed to switch the players on the court with ones on the bench (but each team retains the same number of players that had been on the floor). At the end of the fourth quarter, the team with the most points is declared the victor and is awarded $5,000.

If after the fourth quarter, a tie is reached, the game goes into overtime, in which each team chooses three players to represent them on the court. There are no regenerations, and catching a ball does not bring in a new player—once a player is out, they are out for good. The team which can last the longest is declared the winner of the match.

In the third season, referees are able to give players red cards, much like in soccer. If a player is given a red card, he is out for the rest of the game. Players get red cards if they behave in a particularly improper manner too serious for a yellow card, such as physical contact with an opponent in a harsh manner. Red cards are uncommon, but have been given multiple times. One player, Brian DeCato, was even suspended for the season due to repeated offenses.

Tournament format and prize structure

In season 1, each team played 5 matches; afterwards all 8 competed in the playoffs with 1st facing 8th, 2nd facing 7th, etc. The winners of these playoffs won $10,000.

In season 2, each team played 10 matches, and the top 3 teams from each division reached the playoffs. In the first round, the #2 and #3 seed in each division faced off against each other. The winner of these matches faced the #1 seed of their respective division (who earned a bye in round 1) in a playoff match for $5,000. Then the 2 division winners would face off in the championship match for an additional $20,000 ($25,000 total).

In season 3, the winners of each match received $5,000. As in the previous season, each team played 10 matches. The four teams with the best records competed in the semifinals, where the winners received another $5,000. The grand champions added an additional $10,000 to their total. Potentially a team could win up to $65,000.

Hosts
For all three seasons, the hosts have been Bil Dwyer and Zach Selwyn.

Sideline reporters
 Season 1: Jerri Manthey of Survivor
 Season 2: Mary Strong of NFL Network
 Season 3: Michele Merkin of E! Entertainment Network

Commissioner
Rip Torn, who played Patches O'Houlihan in Dodgeball: A True Underdog Story, joined in Season 3 as the commissioner of the league.

Teams
Each team in Extreme Dodgeball had a gimmick.  This could reflect the fact that gimmick teams were featured heavily in Dodgeball: A True Underdog Story. Usually, the members of a team shared a common profession, indicated in their name.

In the first season, the teams wore clothing linked to their gimmick, for example the CPA wore sweater-vests and neckties, the Stallion Battalion wore racing silks. In the second and third seasons, all teams wore uniforms similar to those worn in basketball, in team colors.

Season 1
 CPA: Certified Public Assassins - Certified Public Accountants, season one champions, and winners of the $10,000 grand prize. They also went undefeated throughout the season.
 Tobias "The Sniper" McKinney - Creator of the famous "Suicide Leap,” where the thrower jumps over the center line, and hits the victim with the ball before he lands, therefore the kill is valid.
 Michael "Handsome" Constanza - Went on to be the MVP of the season. Had amazing throwing skills and clocked in with the most accuracy. Had an 82 MPH throwing speed.
 Mandy "Sunshine" Sommers - Known for catching almost any ball thrown at her.
 Steve Altes
 Gretchen Weiss
 Barbell Mafia - bodybuilders, season runners-up, lost to CPA in the final match.
 Tyrone "The Rush Factor" Rush
 Alan "Diesel" Grimes
 Jeramy "The Mountain" Freeman
 Amazon Beard
 Melissa "Coates Rack" Coates
 Armed Response - security guards
 David "The Animal" Benedetto
 Clay "Chainsaw" Krueger
 Andrew "Barishnikov" Brawley
 Michelle "Manu" Manumaleuna
 Laura "Major" Farley
 Ink, Incorporated - tattoo artists, known to hate the Mimes.
 Ben "Psycho/Evil Robot" Toth
 Shawn "The Hitman" Hauser
 Jessica Cabo "Wabo"
 Damion "The Omen" Troy
 Rebecca Pontius (sister of Mark Pontius of the Mimes and, later, the Reef Sharks)
 Curves of Steel - female bodybuilders, plus a male trainer
 Kel Watrin
 Lillith "Fair" Fields
 Kimberly "Slim Kim" Estrada
 Maritza Franco
 Amelie McKendry
 Silent But Deadly Mimes - mime artists
 Mark "Pretty Boy" Pontius
 Lamonte Goode
 Laura Hight
 Stephen Sande 
 "Angelina" Jolie Bailey
 Stallion Battalion - jockeys
 Kenny "Dirty" Sanchez 
 Mark "M&M" Munoz
 Michael Pipkin
 Christina "Shorty" Knizner
 Lissette Garcia
 Sumo Storm - Sumo wrestlers, lost all six of their matches, including a loss to the CPA in the first playoff round.
 Billy Acquaviva
 "Captain" Americus Abesamis
 Dante Alighieri
 Jon Beardsley
 Crystal "Chainsaw" Cartwright
 Katasha Nelson - filled in two games for Cartwright when she was injured.

Season 2
In this season, the teams were divided into the Classic Division and the Expansion Division. The former consisted of the Top 4 teams from the previous season, and the latter consisted of entirely new teams.

Classic Division
 Armed Response, season two champions, winning the $25,000 grand prize. 
 David Benedetto, returning
 David "Don't Call Me Condoleezza" Rice
 Kel Watrin, returning from Curves of Steel.
 Danno Kingman - filled in for Watrin while he was injured.
 Tanya Fenderbosch
 Nicole Zingale
 (CPA) - Certified Public Assassins - Once Undefeated as the Season 1 champions, but the first time ever lost in other games.
 Tobias McKinney, returning
 Michael Constanza, returning
 Mandy Sommers, returning
 Art "Fly like a" Spiegel
 Natasha Pospich
 Ink, Incorporated
 Ben Toth, returning
 Kimberly Estrada, returning from Curves of Steel.
 Strati Hovartos
 "Scary" Kari Richardson
 Shawn Hauser, returning
 Barbell Mafia, suffered a long losing streak and were eliminated after the regular season. This was surprising, considering most of their players were the same.
 Tyrone Rush, returning
 Melissa Coates, returning
 Jeremy Freeman, returning
 Vanessa Altman
 Alan Grimes, returning

Expansion Division
 Delta Force - military troopers, season runners-up, lost to Armed Response in the championship match. They won $5,000 for reaching the finals.
 Paul "Rambo" Green 
 Lisa "The Beach Tiger" Marshall
 Geoff Mead 
 Linda "I'm Crying" Overhue
 Bobby "Salmon" Roe
 Reef Sharks - surfers
 Chris Bullis 
 Mark "Big Nasty" Long (of Road Rules and Real World/Road Rules Challenge fame)
 Mark Pontius, returning from Silent But Deadly Mimes.
 Melanie Thomas
 Amy Wiseman
 Bling - Urban/Hip-Hop artists
 Alvina "Virginia Slim" Carroll
 Frank "The Tank,” "The Big Pasta" Frisoli
 Portis "The Crazy Chinchilla" Hershey
 Mia "Pimpin'" Parler
 Adam "Malibu's Most Wanted" Ullberg
 MAD: Mutually Assured Destruction - scientists, eliminated after the regular season
 Anna Bartsch
 Tarone Cathcart
 Gary "Spaz" Davis
 Marie Philman
 Marc Van Norden

Season 3
The teams in Season 3 had city themes rather than personal themes. The teams each had seven players, including a celebrity team captain.

 New York Bling - Season Champions
 Mia St. John - her first kill of the season was made in the championship game.
 Tyrone "The Rush Factor" Rush, returning from Season 2's Barbell Mafia, led the league in kills this season with 88.
 Wade Clark
 Tami "Goggles" Bahat
 Greg "The Dirty Hippy" Lang
 Brian DeCato, was ejected at halftime during a game Vs. Detroit Spoilers as he assaulted Strati Hovartez. Eventually, he was suspended for the rest of the season.
 Justin Leffler - replaced DeCato after DeCato was suspended for week 15; was injured during a victory celebration after defeating the Chicago Hitmen, Eventually, he was out for the season.
 Matt "Ryan Seacrest" Gibbons - temporarily replaced DeCato in week 12 and replaced Leffler after Leffler was injured in week 15.
 Portis "The Crazy Chinchilla" Hershey, returning; led the league in Big Ball kills with 6.
 Philadelphia Benjamins - Season Runners-Up
 Jeremiah "The Axeman" Trotter, led celebrity captains for most kills and led the league in Big Ball kills with 6. Was also selected as the favorite male captain by the commissioner of Extreme Dodgeball.
 Michael Lee, filled in for Trotter while Trotter was injured.
 Paul Gene, filled in for Trotter while Trotter was injured. Although Gene got injured himself during a game Vs. Denver Hurlers.
 Chris "Sweatting" Bullis, returning from Reef Sharks.
 Art "Fly Like A" Spigel, returning from CPA, led the league in last man standing survivals.
 Mia Parler, returning from Bling.
 Justin “Blueberry” Hill, led the league in Dead Man Walking kills with 13 and led the team in kills.
 Lisa "The Beach Tiger" Marshall, returning from Season 2's Delta Force.
 Morgan "Needle In The" Hay, was the team leader and 2nd in the league in catches with 30 which included a highlighted double catch wipeout Vs. Denver Hurlers, and ranked fourth in kills with 70.
 Chicago Hitmen - Lost to the Philadelphia Benjamins in the playoff semi-finals
 Hal Sparks
 Rob "Astro" Clyde
 Erik "The Breadtruck" Tillmans
 Anna Bartsch, returning from MAD; was given an honorable mention as she had more catches than all the other female athletes and half of the men in the league.
 K.J. Phelps, led the league and rookies in catches with 34.
 Marie Philman, returning from MAD.
 Kenneth Hughes
 Denver Hurlers - Lost to the New York Bling in the playoff semi-finals
 Tara Dakides
 Bobby "Salmon" Roe, returning from Delta Force.
 Danno Kingman, returned from Season 2's Armed Response (he was their substitute)
 Adrian "The Ghoul" Quihius
 Gary "Spaz" Davis, returning from MAD.
 Kelly "Orale" Lavato, was injured in week 9 after her teammate, Bobb Roe, smashed her against the wall. She was unable to continue for the rest of the season.
 Linda "I'm Crying" Overhue, returning from Season 2's Delta Force; replaced Lavato after Lavato was injured.
 Micah "Lead Me to the Promised Land" Moses
 Los Angeles Armed Response - Eliminated after the regular season
 Mario Lopez
 David "The Animal" Benedetto, returning.
 Kel Watrin, returning.
 Tanya Fenderbosch, returning.
 Damien ”Mouth” Ward
 Mandy "Sunshine" Sommers, returning from CPA.
 Sebastian "Beam Me Up" Sciotti, led the rookies in kills with 87.
 Detroit Spoilers - Lost all ten of their regular season matches
 Kerri Walsh, was selected as the favorite female celebrity captain by the commissioner of Extreme Dodgeball as she had more kills and more points than any other female competitor in the league with 23.
 David "Don't Call Me Condoleezza" Rice, returning from Season 2's Armed Response.
 Jason "The Boner" Caliz
 Strati Hovartez, returning from Ink, Inc., known for his ballistic temper between games despite his great skills.
 Adam "Malibu's Most Wanted" Ullberg, returning from Bling.
 Kimberly "Slim Kim" Estrada, returning from Season 2's Ink, Inc. and Season 1's Curves of Steel.
 Ben "Psycho" Toth, returning from Ink, Inc., known for calling his Big Ball offense “The Fist of the Unicorn.”

References

 

2004 American television series debuts
2005 American television series endings
Dodgeball mass media
Game Show Network original programming
American sports television series